Abraham Lincoln Lim is an American film director and actor.

Early life and education
Lim attended the New York University Tisch School of the Arts, where he completed his BFA and an MFA in film. He grew up in Overland Park, Kansas in the 1970s. For his MFA thesis, he worked on a film, named Fly, that was selected for the university's festival, First Run Film Festival.

Career
Lim made his film debut in 2000 when Roads and Bridges was released. Altman was one of the executive producers. The film was included in festivals such as the St. Louis International Film Festival, Hamptons International Film Festival, and Los Angeles Independent Film Festival.

In 2003, his film, Toy, was selected to screen at Sundance Film Festival. 

In 2005, Lim received a grant from the NAATA media fund and his script Hong Kong Hero was selected for participation in Tribeca All Access Connects, which is part of the Tribeca Film Festival.

In 2006, The Achievers, a film directed by him, was included in the Project Greenlight. In the same year, he became a fellow of the University of Hawaiʻi's Academy for Creative Media. 

In 2010, Lim directed God is D ad, a road movie about young adults going to a comic convention in the late 1980s. The film received Best Feature at the Korean Film Festival of Los Angeles and Phoenix Fan Fusion and was also included at the International Film Festival of India and the Puchon International Fantastic Film Festival.

Filmography
 Roads and Bridges (2001)
 Fists of Cheese (2002)
 The Achievers (2006)
 God is D ad (2010)
 L'Enfant et le poulpe (2020)

References

External links
 

People from Overland Park, Kansas
Lim, Abraham
American male actors of Korean descent
Living people
American film directors of Korean descent
Year of birth missing (living people)
Place of birth missing (living people)
Tisch School of the Arts alumni